The 2012 FIFA U-20 Women's World Cup was the 6th edition of the tournament. The tournament was played in Japan from 19 August to 8 September, with sixteen national football soccer teams and mark the first hosting of a FIFA women's football tournament in the country.

The host nation were to be decided on 19 March 2010 but was postponed by FIFA to give bidders more time to prepare their bids.

On 3 March 2011 FIFA initially awarded the World Cup to Uzbekistan. However, on 18 December 2011 FIFA had the tournament stripped from this country for problems with the bid and named Japan as a possible host. Japan was officially announced as host on 8 February 2012.

Bids and hosting problems
Vietnam had originally won the right the host the tournament. However, Vietnam had to withdraw its bid because it couldn't guarantee government backing and found the FIFA bid process "taxing".

New Zealand had initially been asked to be ready as a backup venue, but were eventually awarded the 2015 FIFA U-20 Men's World Cup and FIFA then awarded the right to host the games to Uzbekistan. However, in its meeting in Tokyo in December 2011, FIFA's Executive Committee decided to cancel Uzbekistan's hosting of the tournament due to "a number of logistical and technical issues", and announced Japan had been proposed as its new organizer.

The Uzbekistan Football Federation had recommended six cities to host games. They are Tashkent, Samarkand, Bukhara, Qarshi, Mubarek and Guzar. The competition would have taken place in Tashkent's Pakhtakor and Bunyodkor Stadiums, Samarkand's Olympic Stadium, Bukhara's Markaziy Stadium, Qarshi's Stadium, Mubarek's Bahrom Vafoev Stadium and Guzar's Stadium.

Host cities and venues

On 31 March 2012, FIFA announced five stadiums for the tournament.

Qualified teams

Notes

Squads

Each team submitted a squad of 21 players, including three goalkeepers. The squads were announced on 10 August 2012.

Match officials
A total of 14 referees and 28 assistant referees were appointed by FIFA for the tournament.

Final draw
The final draw was held on 4 June 2012 in Tokyo. Teams were placed in four pots:
Pot 1: Hosts and continental champions of the AFC, CONCACAF and CONMEBOL
Pot 2: Remaining teams from AFC and CONCACAF
Pot 3: Teams from UEFA
Pot 4: Teams from CAF, OFC and remaining team from CONMEBOL

Group stage
The ranking of each team in each group will be determined as follows:
 greatest number of points obtained in all group matches
 goal difference in all group matches
 greatest number of goals scored in all group matches
If two or more teams are equal on the basis of the above three criteria, their rankings will be determined as follows:
 greatest number of points obtained in the group matches between the teams concerned
 goal difference resulting from the group matches between the teams concerned
 greatest number of goals scored in all group matches between the teams concerned
 drawing of lots by the FIFA Organising Committee
The two teams finishing first and second in each group qualify for the quarter-finals.

All times are Japanese Standard Time (UTC+9).

Group A

Group B

Group C
North Korea's 9–0 win over Argentina set a new competition record as highest win.

Group D

Knockout stage
In the knockout stages, if a match is level at the end of normal playing time, extra time shall be played (two periods of 15 minutes each) and followed, if necessary, by kicks from the penalty mark to determine the winner, except for the play-off for third place where no extra time shall be played as the match is played directly before the final.

Quarter-finals

Semi-finals

Third place match

Final

Awards

The following awards were given for the tournament:

Goalscorers
7 goals
 Kim Un-hwa
6 goals

 Lena Lotzen
 Yōko Tanaka

5 goals

 Kim Su-gyong

4 goals

 Francisca Ordega
 Yun Hyon-hi
 Jeoun Eun-ha
 Maya Hayes

3 goals

 Adriana Leon
 Melanie Leupolz
 Hanae Shibata
 Sofia Huerta
 Desire Oparanozie

2 goals

 Luisa Wensing
 Hikaru Naomoto
 Asuka Nishikawa
 Olivia Jiménez
 Rosie White
 Caroline Hansen
 Ada Hegerberg
 Andrine Hegerberg
 Kealia Ohai

1 goal	

 Yael Oviedo
 Amanda
 Giovanna Oliveira
 Catherine Charron-Delage
 Christine Exeter
 Jenna Richardson
 Jaclyn Sawicki
 Shelina Zadorsky
 Shen Lili
 Zhao Xindi
 Anja Hegenauer
 Lina Magull
 Dzsenifer Marozsán
 Elena Linari
 Ayaka Michigami
 Kumi Yokoyama
 Natalia Gómez Junco
 Yamile Franco
 Evie Myllin
 Osarenoma Igbinovia
 Ngozi Okobe
 Emilie Haavi
 Ina Skaug
 Lee Geum-min
 Eseosa Aigbogun
 Morgan Brian
 Vanessa DiBernardo
 Chioma Ubogagu

Own Goal

 Lin Yuping
 Linda Addai
 Ayu Nakada

References

External links

FIFA U-20 Women's World Cup Japan 2012, FIFA.com
FIFA Technical Report

FIFA U-20 Women's World Cup tournaments
World Cup, 2012
2012
FIFA
August 2012 sports events in Japan
September 2012 sports events in Japan
2012 in youth association football